Halidon is a town and locality in the Australian state of South Australia located about  east of the state capital of Adelaide.

It was gazetted as a town on 25 June 1914 and boundaries for the locality were gazetted on 11 November 1999.

The 2016 Australian census which was conducted in August 2016 reports that Halidon had a population of 18 people.

Sandalwood is located in the local government area of District Council of Karoonda East Murray, the state electoral district of Hammond and the federal Division of Barker.

References

Towns in South Australia